Steven Richard Erickson (born August 14, 1961) is an American sailor and Olympic Champion. Born in Minneapolis, Minnesota, he competed at the 1984 Summer Olympics in Los Angeles and won a gold medal in the Star class with William Earl Buchan.

Steve Erickson won two Star Class World Championships: in 1985 with William Earl Buchan; and, in 1988 with Paul Cayard.

Erickson's first America's Cup was with Tom Blackaller, on the 12 Meter "USA" / US 61, from San Francisco.  He served as the mainsail trimmer.  Perth, Western Australia.  1987.

At the 1992 America's Cup, Erickson was one of the coaches for the Il Moro Challenge.

At the 1995 America's Cup, Erickson was a trimmer on board Dennis Conner Stars & Stripes.

Erickson won the 1997–98 Whitbread Round the World Race as part of the EF Language crew, before joining Luna Rossa as their coach for the 2000 Louis Vuitton Cup, which they won. He was a member of the boat's afterguard during the 2003 Louis Vuitton Cup, before working as their operations manager at the 2007 and 2013 Louis Vuitton Cups. Erickson also spent time with the 2007 Ben Ainslie Team Origin.

References

External links

1961 births
Living people
American male sailors (sport)
Sailors at the 1984 Summer Olympics – Star
Olympic gold medalists for the United States in sailing
Medalists at the 1984 Summer Olympics
Volvo Ocean Race sailors
1995 America's Cup sailors
Il Moro Challenge sailors
Luna Rossa Challenge sailors
2003 America's Cup sailors
Star class world champions
World champions in sailing for the United States
1992 America's Cup sailors